α-Tocotrienol is a form of tocotrienol and one of the chemical compounds that is considered vitamin E.

See also
 β-Tocotrienol
 γ-Tocotrienol
 δ-Tocotrienol

References

Vitamin E